Fejér is a  Hungarian-language surname. It may refer to:

Andor Fejér (born 1960), Hungarian electrical engineer and politician
András Fejér (born 1955), Hungarian cellist
Jules Fejer (1914 - 2002), Hungarian physicist
George Fejer ( (Hungarian: Fejér György) (1766 – 1851), Hungarian author and cleric
George Feyer, born  György Fejér (1921 - 1977), Canadian cartoonist
George Feyer (pianist), born  György Fejér (1908 - 2001)
Géza Fejér (1945), Hungarian discus thrower
Lipót Fejér (1880 - 1959), Hungarian mathematician
Tamás Fejér (1920 – 2006), Hungarian film director

See also
Feyer (surname)

Hungarian-language surnames